Atemnosiphon is a genus of flowering plants belonging to the family Thymelaeaceae.

Its native range is Madagascar.

Species:

Atemnosiphon coriaceus

References

Thymelaeaceae
Malvales genera